Maximaphily is a branch of philately involving the study and creation of maximum cards. It is one of eleven classifications of philately recognised by the Fédération Internationale de Philatélie (FIP) and therefore has its own FIP Commission.

The FIP Maximaphily Commission holds a biennial conference on the subject, most recently in Seoul in 2014.

Maximum card
In philately a maximum card (also known as a maxi-card, or maxicard) is a postcard with a postage stamp placed on the picture side of the card where the stamp and card match or are in maximum concordance (similarity). The cancellation or postmark is usually related to the image on the front of the card and the stamp.

Not every country issues maximum cards (e.g. USA did very few) and some who do (e.g.. Germany) have only a limited number of releases every year whereas others issue maximum cards for every stamp (e.g. Australia).

History
Maximaphily did not become organised until after the Second World War. Before then maximum cards were created as novelties, often by tourists. Maximaphily is closely associated with thematic or topical stamp collecting and many thematic collections are enhanced with appropriate maximum cards.

Elements
A maximum card (maxicard, maxi-card, MC) is made up of three elements: the postcard, the stamp and the postmark. 
The object of maximaphily is to obtain a card where the stamp and picture are in close concordance, ideally with an appropriate cancellation, too. 
If all three elements are concordant, then that card truly is a maximum [concordance] card (hence the name maximaphily). 
Preferably, the image on the postcard should not be simply an enlargement of the image on the stamp. There are exceptions. For example: a work of art, like a  painting (not a detail of it), is often shown in its entirety, both on the postcard and on the stamp of the maxicard.

Competitions
Maximaphily displays have become popular at competitive philatelic exhibitions and special rules have been developed by the FIP to assist in judging the entries.

See also
PHQ card

References

Further reading 
 Brana, René et al. Catalogue des Cartes-Maximum de France: 1901-2007. Amiens: Yvert & Tellier, 2008  1118p.
 Cardoso, Eurico Carlos Esteves Lage. Manual do Coleccionador de Postais-Máximos. Lisbon: The Author, 1984 78p.
 Cardoso, Eurico Carlos Esteves Lage. O fascinio da maximafilia = La fascination de la maximaphilie = Fascination of Maximaphily. Lisbon: The Author, 1984  154p.
 Knight, Jesse F. How To Create Maximum Cards. 1996 23p.
 Les Maximaphiles Français. Les Cartes-Maximum de France: des origines à 1988. Saint-Maur-des-Fossés: les Maximaphiles français, 1989 465p. 
 Rangos, Nicos. What is Maximaphily?, FIP Maximaphily Commission, 2006 Download link.

External links 
FIP maximaphily regulations
Maximaphily description
Ye Choh San. Malaysia Maximaphily
Asia Pacific Maximaphily
Maximum cards of bridges
Malaysia Maximum cards by Ye Choh San
My maxi cards collection
A history of maximum cards
Postcrossing Blog: maximum cards
Maximaphily, traditional and non-traditional Facebook group

Philatelic terminology

he:גלוית מרב#מקסימפיליה